Jeppe Højbjerg (born 30 April 1995) is a Danish professional footballer who plays as a goalkeeper.

Club career
Højbjerg started his career at childhood club Sønderris SK, before moving to Esbjerg fB in 2009, where he was initially an outfield player. However, he was on incidentally moved to the goalkeeper position at practice, and remained at there since. In October 2012, he went on trial with English Premier League club Everton, with the club offering him a youth contract afterwards. Højbjerg, however, chose to stay at Esbjerg in order to gain first-team experience.

He made his professional debut on 26 September 2013, in a Danish Cup match, where he started in a 7–1 win over lower league side Aalborg Chang.

On 16 January 2015, Højbjerg was sent on a six-month loan to Danish 1st Division club FC Fredericia, in order to gain more first-team experience. Until then he had mainly acted as a backup goalkeeper to starter Martin Dúbravka. The loan deal was extended another six months in July 2015.

After returning from the loan spell, Højbjerg became the Esbjerg starting goalkeeper in the second half of the 2015–16 season. He made his Danish Superliga debut for the club on 28 February 2016 away against FC Copenhagen at Parken Stadium.

Since first goalkeeper Jacob Pryts Larsen and reserve goalkeeper Oliver Funch had been injured, Danish 1st Division club Fremad Amager confirmed on 15 October that they had signed a short contract with Højbjerg for the rest of 2022.

International career
Højbjerg has been capped for various Danish national youth teams. In 2016, he competed in the 2016 Summer Olympics with the Denmark Olympic team, which reached the quarter-finals. He made four appearances in the Olympic tournament, conceding a total of six goals. Denmark recorded only one win, against South Africa.

On 3 September 2015, he made his first appearance for the Denmark national under-21 team in a friendly against Germany, which ended in a 2–1 defeat. He participated with the U21 team at the 2017 UEFA European Under-21 Championship. He played three matches in this tournament, conceding a total of seven goals. Denmark recorded only one win, against the Czech Republic.

References

External links
 

Living people
1995 births
People from Esbjerg
Association football goalkeepers
Danish men's footballers
Denmark under-21 international footballers
Denmark youth international footballers
Esbjerg fB players
FC Fredericia players
Fremad Amager players
Danish 1st Division players
Danish Superliga players
Footballers at the 2016 Summer Olympics
Olympic footballers of Denmark
Sportspeople from the Region of Southern Denmark